The Sir Vivian Richards Trophy is a cricket trophy that is awarded to the winner of Test series between South Africa and West Indies. While the two sides first played each other in a Test series in the 1991/92 season, a one-match series in which the West Indians emerged the winners, the series between the two sides was only named starting with the 1998/99 West Indian tour of South Africa, a five-match series won by the hosts 5-0. The Trophy has since been contested another seven times, and South Africa has emerged the winner and retained the Trophy each time.

List of Test series

References

See also 
 South Africa national cricket team
 West Indies cricket team
 West Indian cricket team in South Africa in 2014–15
 South African cricket team in the West Indies in 2010
 West Indian cricket team in South Africa in 2007–08
 South African cricket team in the West Indies in 2004–05
 South African cricket team in the West Indies in 2000–01
 South African cricket team in the West Indies in 1992

Test cricket competitions
Cricket awards and rankings
South Africa in international cricket
West Indies in international cricket